"Too Fake" is a single by American band Hockey, released in 2009 by Capitol Records. The same year, a remix of the song was used as the background for a JCPenney commercial.  In 2010 the song was sampled by American rapper Big Sean on the track "Too Fake", which was produced by Xaphoon Jones and features  American alternative hip hop band Chiddy Bang. Later, the single was featured in the games Saints Row: The Third and NHL 2K10.

References
 http://www.brandweek.com/bw/content_display/news-and-features/retail-restaurants/e3ie3cb96740c26f800a62c9ba8871f9e90

2009 singles
2009 songs
Capitol Records singles